Jacinto del Rosario de Castro (August 15, 1811 – November 13, 1896) was a politician from the Dominican Republic.

Castro was born and died in Santo Domingo.  He served as the 1st acting president of the Dominican Republic from September 7, 1878 until September 29 of that year.

References
Biography at the Enciclopedia Virtual Dominicana

1811 births
1896 deaths
People from Santo Domingo
Presidents of the Dominican Republic